"Mo Bamba" is a single by American rapper Sheck Wes. It was released on June 16, 2017, by Cactus Jack Records, GOOD Music and Interscope Records. It serves as a single from his debut studio album, Mudboy. The song was produced by record production duo Take a Daytrip. The song was a sleeper hit, going viral in mid-2018, approximately a year after its release.

Background
The song is named after then-Texas Longhorn and current Los Angeles Lakers player Mo Bamba, who grew up with Sheck Wes in his home town Harlem, New York neighborhood. The two spent some of their childhoods together.

Producers 16yrold and Take a Daytrip consisting of Denzel Baptise and David Biral, who had met online, collaborated on the track's beat and composition. 16yrold invited Wes to record in the studio with them. Wes recorded the majority of the song in one take, with additional ad-libs recorded afterwards.

Baptise of Take a Daytrip looped the beat as Wes recorded his vocals. The beat cutting off at the 1:38 minute mark of the song was the result of the laptop used to record Wes’ vocals freezing. This caused concern among the producers who feared that the song would be ruined because the entire song up until that point had been recorded in one take without any issues. At the 1:40 minute mark of the song, Ali can be heard in the background saying "woah". Wes shouting out, "Oh! Fuck! Shit! Bitch!", was his actual reaction to the beat freezing by accident. Shortly after, the beat unfroze as Wes proceeded to record a new verse on the spot.

Music video
The song's music video was released on January 30, 2018, via YouTube and was directed by White Trash Tyler, Nick Walker and Wes himself. It is a music video in black and white and finds Wes on a basketball court.

Personnel
Credits adapted from The New York Times.
 Sheck Wes – vocals
 16yrold – production
 Take a Daytrip – production, recording, mixing, mastering

Charts

Weekly charts

Year-end charts

Certifications

References

2017 singles
2017 songs
Sheck Wes songs
Black-and-white music videos
Cactus Jack Records singles
GOOD Music singles
Interscope Records singles
Song recordings produced by Take a Daytrip
Songs about basketball players
Hardcore hip hop songs